Porfiras is a literary periodical published in Corfu since June 1980. The title of the periodical is a dialect word for "shark" taken from a poem of the same title by Dionysios Solomos. It is published on a quarterly basis.

Notes

External links
Selected issues from 1998-2004
An blog post (4 July 2007) on the periodical

1980 establishments in Greece
Literary magazines published in Greece
Greek-language magazines
Magazines established in 1980
Modern Greek literature
Quarterly magazines